Cataonia is a genus of moths of the family Crambidae.

Species
Cataonia erubescens (Christoph, 1877)
Cataonia mauritanica Amsel, 1953

References

Odontiini
Crambidae genera
Taxa named by Émile Louis Ragonot
Taxa described in 1891